Clove Valley could refer to:

 Clove Valley, New York in Dutchess County
 The valley of the Clove Brook in Sussex County, New Jersey
 The valley of Clove Creek in Sussex County, New Jersey